James Byrne (born 23 April 1978) is an Australian rules footballer who played in the Australian Football League (AFL). He played 24 AFL games with the Adelaide Crows and after he was delisted he has played for several other clubs. He was captain of the Geelong Football Club in the Victorian Football League (VFL).

In 2007 he led the Geelong Football Club VFL side to a grand final win over the Coburg Tigers winning 17.24.126 to 7.10.52. To cap a quality season he also was awarded the JJ Liston Trophy for the best and fairest in the VFL. Byrne retired at the end of the 2008 AFL season. He joined Essendon as a Development Coach at the beginning of the 2012 Season.

References

External links

Adelaide Football Club players
J. J. Liston Trophy winners
1978 births
Living people
Glenelg Football Club players
Australian rules footballers from South Australia
South Fremantle Football Club players
Sportspeople from Wagga Wagga